Wawasan LRT station is a Light Rapid Transit station at USJ14 in UEP Subang Jaya in Subang Jaya, Selangor.  This station is located near the primary school of Kompleks Sekolah Wawasan Subang Jaya. The name Wawasan (Vision) refers to school itself. The station serves the nearby USJ 13, USJ 14 and USJ 19 neighborhoods.

It is operated under the Kelana Jaya LRT system network as found in the station signage. Like most other LRT stations operating in Klang Valley, this station is elevated.

Feeder buses

Around the station
Vision School
SK Dato' Onn Jaafar
SJK (C) Tun Tan Cheng Lock (敦陈祯禄华小)
SJK (T) Tun Sambanthan
The 19 USJ City Mall
USJ 13, 14 & 19
Petronas USJ 14
Subang Perdana Goodyear Court 8, 9 & 10

References

External links 
Wawasan LRT Station

Kelana Jaya Line
Subang Jaya